Preah Vihear may refer to:

 Preah Vihear Province, province of Cambodia
 Preah Vihear (town), capital of Preah Vihear Province 
 Preah Vihear Temple, temple and namesake of the province